Colm O'Shaughnessy (born 27 December 1996) is an Irish Gaelic football player who plays at inter-county level for Tipperary, and plays his club football for Ardfinnan in south Tipperary.

Career
O'Shaughnessy made his championship debut for Tipperary in 2015 against Louth. On 31 July 2016, he started at right corner back as Tipperary defeated Galway in the 2016 All-Ireland Quarter-finals at Croke Park to reach their first All-Ireland semi-final since 1935.
On 21 August 2016, Tipperary were beaten in the semi-final by Mayo on a 2-13 to 0-14 scoreline, with O'Shaughnessy going off injured in the second half.

On 22 November 2020, Tipperary won the 2020 Munster Senior Football Championship after a 0-17 to 0-14 win against Cork in the final. It was Tipperary's first Munster title in 85 years.

Honours
Tipperary
Munster Senior Football Championship (1): 2020
 National Football League Division 3 (1): 2017
 Munster Under 21 Football Championship: 2015

References

External links
Tipperary GAA Profile

1996 births
Living people
Ardfinnan Gaelic footballers
Tipperary inter-county Gaelic footballers